The District Weekly was a weekly alternative newspaper published in Long Beach, California, USA.  It was founded in 2007, and published weekly issues between April 2007 and March 2010, going out of business shortly before its third anniversary.

The District Weekly was started by several former employees of the OC Weekly, then headquartered in Santa Ana. They included Patt Buchanan, Miles Clements, Theo Douglas, Ellen Griley, Steve Lowery, Heather Swaim, Will Swaim, Dave Wielenga, and Chris Ziegler.

Like other alternate papers, the District mixed news stories, feature stories, and extensive entertainment listings.

The District primarily covered Long Beach, but also surrounding cities; and for a time featured a separate, ill-fated Orange County edition that was eventually discontinued.

It was available free of charge, and was designed to be advertiser-supported—following the "traditional" model of many alternative weekly newspapers.

But advertising lagged, to the degree where the District found itself hamstrung by those of its continuing advertisers who did not keep up with their bills.

Additionally, the newspaper was beset by several advertising boycotts by local merchants, frustrated by the bright light of its coverage—too illuminating for a big "small town" like Long Beach.

Having run through funds provided by its initial investors, District editors contemplated staff reductions in December 2010—the holidays being the traditional time for layoffs in the newspaper industry—and after a brief, tortuous winter, the newspaper was shuttered in mid-March 2010.

Heather Swaim, one of four partners who initially started the District, subsequently filed with the California Secretary of State's office to cancel the corporation which published the District, Seven Days Publishing LLC.

In November 2010, the California Labor Commission found that six former District employees were owed more than $70,000 for unpaid vacation pay. To date, these monies have not been paid.

The District Weekly's official website, noted below, came down not long after the newspaper went out of business. Its web address went up for auction earlier this year, and was successfully sold for around $1,000.

External links
Official website

<http://www.yelp.com/biz/the-district-weekly-long-beach>

<https://www.facebook.com/pages/The-District-Weekly/76263534706>

<https://twitter.com/districtweekly>

<https://www.flickr.com/groups/districtweekly/>

<http://www.myspace.com/thedistrictweekly>

>http://www.laobserved.com/archive/2010/03/email_from_long_beach_dis.php>

<http://www.mediabistro.com/fishbowlla/the-district-weekly-to-close_b10492>

<http://www.lbpost.com/ryan/8893>

<http://lbguild9400.blogspot.com/2010/03/long-beach-alt-paper-district-weekly-to.html>

<http://www.laobserved.com/archive/2010/03/sounds_like_slim_hope_for.php>

<http://www.laobserved.com/archive/2010/03/in_the_district_weekly_sa.php>

<http://greaterlongbeach.com/23/11/2010/former-district-weekly-employees-win-70000-judgement-against-swaims-publishing-company>

<http://www.topix.com/forum/city/long-beach-ca/TRTKVD8VU7CR6KVOQ#comments>

Weekly newspapers published in California
Mass media in Long Beach, California